Gudgel is an unincorporated community in Gibson County, Indiana, in the United States.

History
Gudgel was named for Andrew Gudgel, a pioneer settler.

References

Unincorporated communities in Gibson County, Indiana
Unincorporated communities in Indiana